This is a partial list of named lunar craters according to the Gazetteer of Planetary Nomenclature maintained by the International Astronomical Union includes the diameter of the crater and the person the crater is named for. Where a crater formation has associated satellite craters, these are detailed on the main crater description pages.



T 

back to top

U 

back to top

V 

back to top

W 

back to top

X 

back to top

Y 

back to top

Z 

back to top

References

T